Åsa Gunilla Elisabet Nyström (born 12 August 1960 in Umeå) is a Swedish prelate and current bishop of the Diocese of Luleå.

Biography
Nyström was ordained priest of the Swedish Evangelical Mission in 1982. In 1991 she was incardinated as a diocesan priest of the Church of Sweden. She has worked as director of studies and teachers in leadership at the Pastoral Institute in Uppsala and development secretary at the Swedish Church parish associations, focusing on management and leadership development. Most recently she worked as diocesan curate of leadership support at Uppsala diocese. She has also been a teacher and course director for management and leadership development in the Swedish Church.

Bishop
On November 15, 2018, Nyström 50.07% of the votes for the bishopric of Luleå, with a total of 267 votes. On June 3, 2018, she was consecrated bishop by the Archbishop of Uppsala in Uppsala Cathedral. On June 10, she was installed as Bishop of Luleå in Luleå Cathedral.

References

Living people
1960 births
Swedish Lutheran bishops
21st-century Lutheran bishops
Bishops of Luleå
People from Umeå